1÷x=1 (Undivided) is the third mini-album by South Korean boy band Wanna One. It was released on June 4, 2018, by Swing Entertainment and Stone Music Entertainment.

Release and promotion
1÷x=1 (Undivided) is a follow-up of the band's arithmetic-themed album series. In April, Wanna One announced that the members will split into multiple units and collaborate with different artists such as Dynamic Duo, Zico, Nell and Heize for their upcoming album. On May 7, Wanna One announced the title of the new "Special" album, 1÷x=1 (Undivided) through a teaser video. It will contain the songs produced during their unit projects, which will be shown on the group's reality show Wanna One Go: X-con.

Units
The different units were unveiled on the first day of Wanna One Go: X-con.

On June 4, the album was released, along with the music video of the lead single, "Light".

Wanna One filmed the live performance of "Light" and the unit songs during their Day 1 Concert in Seoul on June 1, which was broadcast live on Mnet, the channel's YouTube account and the group's Facebook account, through the group's reality show, Wanna One Go: X-con on June 4. They also promoted on music shows for two weeks.

Production and composition
The title of the album is inspired by arithmetical operations like the band's previous releases: 1X1=1 (To Be One), 1-1=0 (Nothing Without You), and 0+1=1 (I Promise You). Every sub-unit track on the album is produced by a high-profile South Korean artist. The lead single, "Light" is a UK garage-inspired electropop track containing a catchy chorus and EDM breakdown. The song features all the eleven members of the band. “Forever and a Day” is an evocative pop rock track groove ballad. The song is produced by Kim Jong Wan, the vocalist of indie rock band Nell. It features the members Yoon Ji-sung, Ha Sung-woon and Hwang Min-hyun and sonically, sounds similar to the style of its writer Kim. “11” is a groovy alternative R&B track produced by  Gaeko and Choiza of Dynamic Duo. The song features Lai Kuan-lin, Park Ji-hoon, and Bae Jin-young. “Sandglass” is a breezy track produced by Heize and featuring Ong Seong-wu and Lee Dae-hwi. The lyrics talk about with the theme of an hourglass that symbolizes memories that do not disappear, but are there for a limited time. “Kangaroo” is a summery hip hop track produced by Block B’s Zico and contains  punky rhythms and melodies. The song features members Kim Jae-hwan, Kang Daniel and Park Woo-jin.

Track listing

Charts

Weekly charts

Year-end charts

Certifications

Awards

References

2018 albums
Korean-language albums
YMC Entertainment albums
Wanna One albums